Chris or Christopher Alexander may refer to:

Christopher James Alexander (1887–1917), English ornithologist
Christopher Alexander (1936–2022), British-American architect and design theorist
Chris Alexander (politician) (born 1968), Canadian politician
Chris Alexander (editor), Canadian editor of Fangoria magazine and horror film director

See also
Cris Alexander (1920–2012), American actor, singer, dancer, designer, and photographer